Thomas Dantzler may refer to:
 T. C. Dantzler (born 1970), American wrestler
 Tom Dantzler (born 1941), American politician